was a district located in Ōita Prefecture, Japan.

As of 2003, the district had an estimated population of 40,723 and density of 99.35 persons per km2. The total area was 409.90 km2.

Dissolution
As of January 1, 2005 the district had 4 towns.
 Hasama
 Notsuharu
 Shōnai
 Yufuin

Merger
 On January 1, 2005 - the town of Notsuharu, along with the town of Saganoseki (from Kitaamabe District), was merged with the expanded city of Ōita.
 On October 1, 2005 - the towns of Hasama, Shōnai and Yufuin were merged to create the city of Yufu. Therefore, Ōita District was dissolved as a result of this merger.

See also
 Merger and dissolution of municipalities of Japan

Former districts of Ōita Prefecture